Major-General Sir John Clayton Cowell PC KCB (14 January 1832 – 29 August 1894) was a British Army officer and later Master of the Queen's Household and lieutenant-governor of Windsor Castle.

Early life
Clayton was born at Bean, near Canterbury, in 1832 the son of John Clayton Cowell and Frances Ann Hester, daughter of the Rev. Richard Brickenden. He was educated at the Royal Military Academy at Woolwich. In 1850 he joined the Royal Engineers, he served with the Baltic fleet and at Crimea, where he was aide-de-camp to General Sir Harry Jones and where he wounded himself on 10 August 1854 by accidentally discharging a revolver he had borrowed from Bartholomew Sulivan. He was sent to recuperate on the hospital ship Belleisle.

Royal household
Clayton returned to England and from 1856 to 1866 he became governor to the young Prince Alfred, who in 1866 became the Duke of Edinburgh. Clayton performed the same role for a year with Prince Leopold until Leopold became 21. For his duties with the royal princes he was an appointed a Knight Commander of the Order of the Bath.

In 1866 Clayton was appointed as Master of the Queen's Household and he retired from the Army in 1879 with the honorary rank of major-general. In 1892 he was appointed lieutenant-governor of Windsor Castle. He was with the Queen's permission responsible for having electric lights installed at Windor Castle. The town of Cowell, South Australia was named in his honour.

Family life
He married Georgiana Elizabeth Pulleine in 1868, the only child of James Pulleine of Clifton Castle at Clifton-on-Yore, Yorkshire, which Georgiana inherited. They had two sons and two daughters. Queen Victoria was godmother to their eldest son, Albert Victor John (born 12 June 1869).

He died in 1894 at East Cowes on the Isle of Wight due to heart failure. His son Albert succeeded to the Clifton Castle estate.

References

1832 births
1894 deaths
Members of the Privy Council of the United Kingdom
Masters of the Household
Royal Engineers officers
Graduates of the Royal Military Academy, Woolwich
British Army personnel of the Crimean War
Knights Commander of the Order of the Bath
People from Blean